Innovation Central High School, founded in 1911 as Central High School, is a public high school located at 421 Fountain Street NE in Grand Rapids, Michigan. The high school offers classes for grades 9-12. The school colors are Gold and  Black, and the school mascot is the Ram.

History

A previous school known as Grand Rapids High School was opened in 1859, and located in an old stone schoolhouse.  New buildings were constructed in 1867 and 1893.  A new school was constructed from 1910–1911, at a cost of US$435,000, and opened to students on January 31, 1911. The initial class incorporated students from grades 9 through 12, and some courses that eventually evolved into Grand Rapids Community College, which was itself founded in 1914.  The high school had a large auditorium, the largest in Michigan at the time that the school was built, so famous figures such as presidents Teddy Roosevelt and William Howard Taft have spoken there. In 1947, the school's football team won the state championship.

In 2013, Central High School consolidated with Creston High School, with the consolidated high school now located on the Central High School campus.  Creston High School's former campus became that of City High-Middle School from that year onward. In 2014, the school was renamed the Innovation Central High School along with the consolidation of the district's other career-oriented programs.

Notable alumni
 Terry Barr (1935-2009), football player for the Detroit Lions
 Hugh Blacklock (1893-1954), NFL player
 John Melville Burgess (1909-2003), diocesan bishop of Massachusetts and the first African American to head an Episcopal diocese.
 Roger B. Chaffee (1935-1967), astronaut
 Rex Cherryman (1896-1928), actor
 Robert Dean (Michigan politician) (b. 1954), member of the Michigan House of Representatives
 Arthur Carter Denison (1861-1942), federal judge
 Clarence Ellis (b. 1950), football player for the Atlanta Falcons
 Betty Ford (1918-2011), former First Lady, wife of President Gerald Ford
 Arnold Gingrich (1903-1976), editor
 Paul G. Goebel (1901-1988), mayor
 Ralph Hauenstein (1912-2016), United States Army officer, newspaper editor
 Julius Houseman (1832-1891), politician
 Charles Leonard (1913-2006), general
 Buster Mathis (1943-1996), boxer
 Thomas Francis McAllister, Federal judge
 Gordon Scott (1926-2007), actor who portrayed Tarzan
 Leo Sowerby (1895-1968), composer
 Frank Steketee (1900-1951), football player for the University of Michigan Wolverines
 Arthur Vandenberg (1884-1951), Republican senator who participated in the creation of the United Nations
 Gilbert White (1877-1931), American painter 
 Stewart Edward White (1873-1946), author
 Elizabeth Wilson (1921-2015), actress

References

Public high schools in Michigan
Education in Grand Rapids, Michigan
Schools in Kent County, Michigan
Educational institutions established in 1911
1911 establishments in Michigan